The Thornton Adobe Barn near Isabel, Kansas was built in 1942.  It is a Gambrel roofed adobe dairy barn.  It was listed on the National Register of Historic Places in 2003.

It is a  barn built by James Edward Thornton and other members of the Isabel community.  Built during materials shortages of World War II, it utilized adobe bricks to make the lower story's walls and utilized recycled corrugated metal to make the exterior walls of the hayloft.  The adobe walls were covered with stucco inside and out.

References

Barns on the National Register of Historic Places in Kansas
Buildings and structures completed in 1942
Pratt County, Kansas